Eratyrus is a genus of insects belonging to the assassin bug subfamily Triatominae.  There are two species in this genus; both are associated with Trypanosoma cruzi:
Eratyrus cuspidatus (Stål, 1859)
Eratyrus mucronatus (Stål, 1859)

References

Reduviidae
Taxa named by Carl Stål
Cimicomorpha genera